Beechwood is an unincorporated community in Crawford County, Indiana, in the United States.

History
Beechwood contained a post office between 1875 and 1963. The community was named from the presence of beech trees at the town site.

References

Unincorporated communities in Crawford County, Indiana
Unincorporated communities in Indiana